Fortress Japan (Katakana: フォートレスジャパン) is a Japanese company that operates eikaiwa English conversation schools under brands including Global Trinity （Katakana: グローバルトリニティー）. The Consumer Affairs Agency and the Tokyo metropolitan government shut down the company for six months in February 2010 due to its coercive  marketing practices, which included false explanations and harassment—both illegal under Japanese law.

Branch history
The first school was opened in Osaka in 1986. The next year, Tokyo and Nagoya schools were opened. The Fukuoka-shi branch that opened in 2005 was its first in Southern Japan, and in the next year the Sendai branch began operations in Northern Japan. In July 2009 the Tokyo, Nagoya, and Osaka branches changed their branding to HER-S (ハーツ).

Sites offline
Both the global-trinity.com and her-s.net websites have been taken down pursuant to the governmental suspension of operations order.

External links
Nambu Foreign Workers Caucus English school ordered to close / Court warned Fortress Japan last year over coercive sales practices February 19, 2010 
山本ケイ  消費者団体が英会話スクール「グローバルトリニティー」運営のフォートレスジャパンに、不当勧誘の中止を申し入れ 2008/06/26 
Press release 消費者庁 ニュースリリース  PDF

See also
Consumer protection
特定商取引に関する法律

References

English conversation schools in Japan
Education companies based in Tokyo